Juglans hindsii, commonly called the Northern California black walnut and Hinds's black walnut, is a species of walnut tree native to the western United States (California and Oregon). It is commonly called claro walnut by the lumber industry and woodworkers, and is the subject of some confusion over its being the root stock for English walnut orchard stock.

Distribution
The historical range of Juglans hindsii is from the San Joaquin Valley and Sacramento Valley to the Inner Northern California Coast Ranges and San Francisco Bay Area, in Northern California. A 2020 IUCN assessment has extended this range: north to Oregon and south to Southern California, in areas of similar habitat type. The northernmost pre-colonial Juglans hindsii tree was located in Douglas County, Oregon before it was blown over in November 2017. A ring count determined the tree predated the arrival of settlers by approximately 100 years. The Native Plant Society of Oregon has also documented multiple trees of pre-colonial age in Oregon's Rogue Valley.

The tree grows in riparian woodlands, either in mono-species stands, or mixed with California oak species (Quercus spp.) and Fremont cottonwood (Populus fremontii) trees.

Conservation
Juglans hindsii was formerly assessed as Seriously Endangered on the California Native Plant Society Rare Plant Inventory. In a 2019 revision, the species was upgraded to common. It is threatened by hybridization with orchard trees, urbanization, and habitat conversion to agriculture.

Description

This species normally has a single erect trunk, commonly without branches in the lower half of the tree, and a crown that can be wider than the tree is tall. Trunks may reach  in diameter near the base of the tree.

Unlike the Southern California walnut, the vein angles bear tufts of hair.

The nut has a smooth, brown, thick shell, that contains a small edible nutmeat.

Allergenicity
Hind's Walnut (Juglans hindsii) is a severe allergen. Pollination:  Occurs in following seasons depending on latitude and elevation: Spring.

Uses

Cultivation
Juglans hindsii has been commercially important as a rootstock for orchard stock of Juglans regia (English walnut) trees all over the world. It is also used as a parent to the fast-growing Luther Burbank hybrid rootstock, commonly called "Paradox" (Juglans hindsii x Juglans regia).

Ornamental tree
The Northern California walnut is cultivated by specialty California native plant nurseries. It is used as an ornamental tree in traditional and wildlife gardens, and for habitat gardens, natural landscaping projects, and climate compatible drought tolerant gardens.  The tree is also planted in habitat restoration projects.

Pests 
Juglans hindsii is infested by Rhagoletis juglandis, commonly known as the walnut husk fly, which lays its eggs in the husks of walnut fruit. R. juglandis infests other varieties of walnut trees as well, such as Juglans regia (the English or Persian walnut), Juglans rupestris (a species of walnut indigenous to Arizona and Texas), and Juglans hindsii (the California black walnut).

Lumber
The wood of Juglans hindsii is commonly called claro walnut by the lumber industry and woodworkers.  It is highly figured with a rich brown color and striking grain patterns, especially in the crotch areas, where large limbs meet the trunk. It is used in small quantities to make fine furniture and gun stocks, and sold as slabs to make large natural-top tables because of its durability, good working properties, and swirling iridescent figure.

Some confusion exists about the nature of claro walnut because Juglans hindsii is commonly used as the rootstock of orchard trees.  The section below the original graft is claro walnut wood, while the section above is the lighter-colored English walnut.  Some woodworkers take advantage of this by making the color change a feature of their work.

Taxonomy
The current classification of the plant is as a distinct species. Some botanists and the 1993 edition of  "The Jepson Manual" had classified it as Juglans californica subsp. hindsii, a subspecies of Juglans californica (Southern California black walnut).

References

"Some preliminary observations on the California black walnut (Juglans californica)" — Anderson, E. N.; Fremontia: A Journal of the California Native Plant Society.  January 2002.

External links

 Jepson Flora Project: Juglans hindsii
 Calflora Database: Juglans hindsii'' (Northern California black walnut)
 Virginia Tech tree ID: Hind's black walnut (Juglans hindsii) 
 Juglans hindsii — U.C. Photo gallery

hindsii
Trees of the Southwestern United States
Natural history of the California chaparral and woodlands
Natural history of the California Coast Ranges
Natural history of the Central Valley (California)
Trees of Mediterranean climate
Edible nuts and seeds
Plants used in Native American cuisine
Pre-Columbian California cuisine
Garden plants of North America
Drought-tolerant trees
Ornamental trees
Plants described in 1909